Pedunculacetabulum is a genus of trematodes in the family Opecoelidae.

Species
Pedunculacetabulum inopinipugnus Martin, Cutmore & Cribb, 2018
Pedunculacetabulum manteri Nagaty, 1942
Pedunculacetabulum opisthorchis Yamaguti, 1934

References

Opecoelidae
Plagiorchiida genera